The California Golden Bears college football team competes as part of the National Collegiate Athletic Association (NCAA) Division I Football Bowl Subdivision (FBS), representing the University of California, Berkeley in the North Division of the Pac-12 Conference (Pac-12). Since the establishment of the team in 1886, California has appeared in 24 bowl games, including eight appearances in the Rose Bowl Game. Their latest bowl appearance was the 2019 Redbox Bowl, where California won against the Illinois Fighting Illini 35–20, to give the Golden Bears an overall bowl record of 12–11–1 (.521).

Key

Bowl games

Notes

References
General

Specific

California Golden Bears

Golden Bears
California Golden Bears bowl games